Cyril Leander Abeynaike (22 February 1911 – 8 May 1991) was a former Anglican Bishop of Colombo, Sri Lanka.

Educated at Royal College, Colombo and went on to study history at the University College, Colombo and theology at the King's College, London. He was made the Archdeacon of Colombo before he was elected as the Bishop of Colombo.

See also
Church of Ceylon
Anglican Bishop of Colombo
Anglican Diocese of Colombo
St. Luke's Church Borella

References

External links
 The Church of Ceylon (Anglican Communion)
 Anglican Church of Ceylon News

20th-century Anglican bishops in Asia
Sinhalese priests
Sri Lankan Anglican bishops
Sri Lankan educational theorists
Sri Lankan chaplains
Anglican chaplains
Alumni of Royal College, Colombo
Alumni of the Ceylon University College
Alumni of King's College London
Anglican bishops of Colombo
1991 deaths
1911 births
Sri Lankan expatriates in the United Kingdom